Harold Butler may refer to:
Harold Butler (businessman) (1921–1998), American entrepreneur
Harold Butler (cricketer) (1913–1991), English bowler
Harold Butler of European League for Economic Cooperation
Harold Butler (musician), Jamaican pianist and songwriter 
Harold Butler (civil servant) (1883–1951), British civil servant

See also
Harry Butler (disambiguation)